Future Road is a studio album credited to Australian recording artist Judith Durham and The Seekers. It is Durham's eighth studio album and The Seekers' eleventh.
The album was released in Australia in October 1997 and peaked at number 4 on the ARIA Charts and by Christmas  was certified platinum.

The album was re-released on 25 October 2013, with a bonus "Making of Future Road" DVD and video clips.

Track listing
 "Calling Me Home" (Judith Durham, Jeff Vincent) - 3:40
 "Speak to the Sky" (Rick Springfield) - 3:36
 "The Bush Girl" (Henry Lawson, Bruce Woodley) - 4:58
 "It Doesn't Matter Anymore" (Paul Anka) - 3:01
 "Future Road" (Keith Potger, Trevor Spencer, Boyd Wilson) - 3:54
 "The Shores of Avalon" (Judith Durham, Athol Guy, John Kovac, Keith Potger, Bruce Woodley) - 4:00
 "Guardian Angel/Guiding Light" (Keith Potger) - 2:32
 "Amazing" (Bruce Woodley/Michael Cristiano) - 3:17	
 "Gotta Love Someone" (Bruce Woodley/Michael Cristiano) - 3:20
 "Forever Isn't Long Enough (For Me)" (Keith Potger, Byron Hill) - 3:05
 "The Circle of Love" (Rick Beresford / Keith Potger) - 3:06
 "It's Hard to Leave" (Judith Durham) - 4:01

Charts

Weekly charts

Year-end charts

Certifications

References

Judith Durham albums
The Seekers albums
1997 albums
EMI Records albums